Phyllidiopsis gemmata is a species of sea slug, a dorid nudibranch, a shell-less marine gastropod mollusk in the family Phyllidiidae.

Distribution 
This species was described from Java, Indonesia. It has been reported from Réunion Island and southern Thailand.

Description
This nudibranch has a grey or pink dorsum with compound tubercles with white apices. There are four longitudinal black lines and radiating black lines between the outer line and the edge of the mantle. It is a moderately large Phyllidiid, growing to at least 45 mm in length. It is similar to Phyllidiopsis krempfi but that species has a pattern of black lines on the back.

Diet
This species feeds on a sponge.

References

Phyllidiidae
Gastropods described in 1957